Javier Alejandro Almirón (born February 9, 1980 in Lanús) is an Argentine professional football player who last played for FC Luch-Energiya Vladivostok.

External links
 BDFA profile
 Primera División Argentina statistics

1980 births
Living people
Sportspeople from Lanús
Argentine expatriate footballers
Argentine footballers
Expatriate footballers in Spain
Argentine Primera División players
Club Atlético Lanús footballers
CD Tenerife players
Polideportivo Ejido footballers
Deportivo Alavés players
Girona FC players
Argentine expatriate sportspeople in Spain
FC Luch Vladivostok players
Expatriate footballers in Russia
Association football defenders